Antelope Grocery is a historic mixed-use building in Lincoln, Nebraska. It was built in 1922 for Roy B. Palin and his wife Julia, with a grocery store on the first floor and residential apartments on the second floor. It was designed in the Tudor Revival style by the architectural firm Fiske & Meginnis. It has been listed on the National Register of Historic Places since March 17, 1988.

References

	
National Register of Historic Places in Lancaster County, Nebraska
Tudor Revival architecture in Nebraska
Commercial buildings completed in 1922
Residential buildings completed in 1922
1922 establishments in Nebraska
Grocery store buildings
Retail buildings in Nebraska